Leslie Glyndwr Pridham (30 December 1937 – 19 February 2021) was an Australian rules footballer who played with Essendon in the Victorian Football League (VFL).

Pridham, a rover, made his way into the Essendon team from East Sandringham. He started out in the thirds and won a Gardiner Medal in 1957 for his performances in the league seconds. That year he made his first and only senior appearance, playing in Essendon's 27-point loss to Richmond at Punt Road Oval.

After leaving Essendon he played for Rochester.

References

1937 births
2021 deaths
Australian rules footballers from Victoria (Australia)
Essendon Football Club players
Rochester Football Club players